Jason Lee (born 16 January 1971) is the head coach of Dudley Hill and former professional rugby league footballer who played in the 1990s and 2000s.

Playing career

International honours
Jason Lee won 5 caps (plus 2 as substitute) for Wales in 1994–2001 while at Warrington Wolves, Keighley Cougars, and Halifax 2-tries 8-points.

Club career
Jason Lee made his début for Warrington Wolves on Wednesday 9 November 1994, and he played his last match for Warrington Wolves Sunday 24 September 1995.

Post-rugby career
Since the end of his playing career, Lee has coached at amateur level, and is currently coach for Bradford-based club Dudley Hill. Lee has worked in education since retiring from the professional game, and is currently Behaviour Lead at Hanson School in Bradford.

References

External links
Statistics at wolvesplayers.thisiswarrington.co.uk

1971 births
Bradford Dudley Hill players
Doncaster R.L.F.C. players
Halifax R.L.F.C. players
Keighley Cougars players
Living people
Place of birth missing (living people)
Wales national rugby league team players
Warrington Wolves players
Rugby league wingers